Yerevan is the capital and the largest city of Armenia and home to most of the sports venues within the republic.

Association football

Stadiums
Yerevan is home to many stadiums that regularly host the Armenian Premier League and Armenian First League matches:

Training centres
Currently, Yerevan is home to 4 football training centres/academies:
Pyunik Training Centre owned by FC Pyunik, located in Kentron District, Yerevan: is home to 3 natural-grass regular-sized pitches as well as the Pyunik Stadium.
Banants Training Centre owned by FC Banants, located in Malatia-Sebastia District, Yerevan: is home to 2 natural-grass and 1 artificial turf regular-sized pitches as well as the Banants Stadium.
Technical Center-Academy of the Football Federation of Armenia, located in Avan District, Yerevan: is home to 8 natural-grass and 2 artificial turf regular-sized pitches as well as the main stadium.

Other sports

Indoor sports
Karen Demirchyan Complex
Mika Sports Arena
Dinamo Sports Arena

Tennis
Incourt Tennis Club
Ararat Tennis Club

Other
Tigran Petrosian Chess House
Hovik Hayrapetyan Equestrian Centre
Mirage Equestrian Centre
Yerevan Velodrome
Yerevan Figure Skating and Hockey Sports School
Ararat Valley Golf Club
Arena Bowling and Billiards Club
Olympavan Olympic Training Complex
Yerevan State Sports College of Olympic Reserve
Armenia Sports Union

References

Sport venues
Sports venues